The 2000 Dallas Burn season was the fifth season of the Major League Soccer team. The team made the playoffs for the fifth consecutive year. It would be the final season that Dave Dir was head coach.

Final standings

Regular season

Playoffs

Quarterfinals

U.S. Open Cup

References

External links
 Season statistics

FC Dallas seasons
Dallas Burn
Dallas Burn
Dallas Burn